The Rușor is a left tributary of the Strei in Romania. It flows into the Strei in the village Rușor.

References

Rivers of Romania
Rivers of Hunedoara County